Kenneth R. Cox (born October 8, 1928) is an Ohio Democratic politician and a former member of the Ohio General Assembly.

Life
Born in Ohio in 1928, Cox attended the University of Akron. He was serving as mayor of Barberton, Ohio, when he opted to run for an open seat in the Ohio House of Representatives in 1972. He ended up being reelected in 1974. In 1976, Senator David Headley announced his retirement, and Cox won election to his Ohio Senate seat.

In 1982, Cox considered a run for Ohio Treasurer, and eventually entered the race. However, he lost the primary nomination. While defeated in the treasurer's election, new Ohio Governor Dick Celeste announced soon after that he would appoint Cox as the Director for the Department of Public Safety.

Celeste again appointed Cox as Department of Commerce Director in 1985. Two years later, he left state government to work as a private consultant. He went on to return to his roots, running for Barberton City Council in 1993 and winning a seat, and has since advocated for his local communities.

References

1928 births
People from Barberton, Ohio
University of Akron alumni
Mayors of places in Ohio
Living people
Democratic Party Ohio state senators

 "This guy is agreat guy" Said a friend of his.